"Knowing You" is a song by American country music artist Kenny Chesney. It was released on March 15, 2021 as the fourth single from his 2020 album Here and Now. The song was co-written by Adam James, Brett James and Kat Higgins, and produced by Chesney with Buddy Cannon.

Background
Chesney explained the song is about losing a person who was close to you and choosing to look back at the relationship with gratitude rather than sadness, gratitude and being happy that someone was in your life in the first place.

At CMT's interview, he mentioned: “This song is really special to me. It holds everything that drew me to country music at a time when nothing really sounds like what this is.”

Music video
The music video was released on March 12, 2021, and directed by Shaun Silva. It was filmed in Gloucester, Massachusetts. Juxtaposed sunny days and the beaches of the Virgin Islands with fog, mist, and hard work of life, Chesney took to the open sea on the local fishing boat Orion.

Live performance
On April 18, 2021, Chesney performed the song at the 56th Academy of Country Music Awards.

Charts

Weekly charts

Year-end charts

Certifications

References

2021 singles
2021 songs
Kenny Chesney songs
Songs written by Brett James
Song recordings produced by Buddy Cannon
Warner Records Nashville singles
Songs written by Kenny Chesney